George Gertan Klauber (5 March 1932 – 1 August 2008) was a British bit part character actor.

Klauber was born in Czechoslovakia, and after training at the Birmingham Theatre School, his stage appearances included with the RSC and the National Theatre. He played small roles in many of the Carry On films and appeared in numerous television productions, often playing minor villains, including episodes of The Saint, The Professionals, Danger Man, The Avengers, twice in Doctor Who as The Galley Master in The Romans and as Ola in The Macra Terror and as mad king George III in Blackadder the Third. He appeared in the TV musical Pickwick for the BBC in 1969. He also played a servile yet pompous waiter in one episode, "The Old Magic", of Whatever Happened to the Likely Lads?.

He was married to the British actress Gwendolyn Watts.

Partial filmography

Battle of the V-1 (1958) - SS Guard - Stefan at Dentist (uncredited)
Don't Panic Chaps! (1959) - Schmidt
Beyond the Curtain (1960) - Reception Clerk (uncredited)
The Hands of Orlac (1960) - Fairground attendant (uncredited)
The Breaking Point (1961) - Lofty
Three on a Spree (1961) - Joe
The Kitchen (1961) - Gaston
The Pursuers (1961) - Bernstein
Hot Enough for June (1964) - Technician in Czech Glass Factory
Carry On Spying (1964) - Code Clerk
Carry On Cleo (1964) - Marcus
Operation Crossbow (1965) - Security Guard at Rocket Plant (uncredited)
Dateline Diamonds (1965) - Meverhof
The Big Job (1965) - Milkman
The Deadly Affair (1966) - Businessman (uncredited)
Follow That Camel (1967) - Algerian Spiv (uncredited)
Carry On Doctor (1967) - Wash Orderly
Vendetta for the Saint (1969) - Renato
Before Winter Comes (1969) - Russian Major
Scream and Scream Again (1970) - Border Guard (uncredited)
Cry of the Banshee (1970) - Tavern Keeper
Wuthering Heights (1970)
Venom (aka The Legend of Spider Forest) (1971) - Kurt
Carry On Henry (1971) - Bidet
Our Miss Fred (1972) - German Officer (uncredited)
The Pied Piper (1972) - Town Cryer
Up the Front (1972) - Donner
Carry On Abroad (1972) - Postcard Seller 
Soft Beds, Hard Battles (1974) - 3rd Gestapo Agent
Percy's Progress (1974) - Pablo
Upstairs, Downstairs (1974, Episode: "The Beastly Hun") - Albert Schoenfeld
Operation: Daybreak (1975) - Kubelwagen Driver (uncredited)
The Seven-Per-Cent Solution (1976) - The Pasha
Carry On Emmannuelle (1978) - German Soldier
Bad Timing (1980) - Ambulance Man
Octopussy (1983) - Bubi
Top Secret! (1984) - Mayor of Berlin
The Living Daylights (1987) - Fairground Cafe Owner (uncredited)
Blackadder the Third (1987, Episode 6: "Duel and Duality") - King George III, a mad monarch
Jack the Ripper (1988) - Diemschutz
Backbeat (1994) - Pimp

References

External links

Guardian.co.uk 28 November 2008: Obituary

1932 births
2008 deaths
British male stage actors
British male film actors
British male television actors
Czechoslovak emigrants to England